Luigi Romanelli (July 21, 1751March 1, 1839) was an Italian opera librettist.

Romanelli was born in Rome.

He wrote tens of librettos, most of them for operas to be performed at La Scala in Milan. In the same city he was professor of declamation at the conservatory.

Among his most successful works, La pietra del paragone for Rossini, Elisa e Claudio for Mercadante, Fedra for Mayr and La vestale for Pacini

Romanelli died in Milan in 1839.

Operas based on librettos by Romanelli

References
 John Black, "Romanelli, Luigi", The New Grove Dictionary of Music and Musicians, Second Edition (London: Macmillan, 2001). .

External links
 
 

1751 births
1839 deaths
Writers from Rome
Italian opera librettists
18th-century Italian writers
18th-century Italian male writers
19th-century Italian writers
Milan Conservatory alumni
Italian male dramatists and playwrights
19th-century Italian male writers
Academic staff of Milan Conservatory